Sapana Pradhan Malla (Nepali: सपना प्रधान मल्ल)  (born November 15, 1963 -) is a Nepalese Supreme Court Judge since August 1, 2016 and a former member of the Nepalese Constituent Assembly. As a lawyer and politician, she is a well-known figure in Nepal due to her work to advance women's rights and increase inclusive language in the country's constitution. She is a former president of the Forum for Women, Law & Development. In 2008, she was a joint winner of the Gruber Prize for Women’s Rights. Born in Nawalparasi district, Malla has a master's degree in Comparative Law from the University of Delhi. She also has a Mid-Career Masters from Harvard Kennedy School of Government. She was a member of the Committee Against Torture (CAT) 2014–2017 term.

Early life 
Malla was born on November 15, 1963 in Nawal Parasi in Nepal.

Education 
Malla received a master's degree in Comparative Law (MCL) from the University of Delhi, India in 1990 Mid Career Master in Public Administration dministration(MC/MPA) from Harvard University, USA and a bachelor's degree in,  Law from Tribhuvan University in Kathmandu, Nepal in 1987.

Career 
Malla served as a member of the Nepalese Constituent Assembly, or parliament, from May 2008 to May 2012, during which time she advocated for women's rights in all areas—from reproductive rights to citizenship. When asked about the challenges she faces as an advocate for women's rights, she told PassBlue: "When I started working on women’s rights, I decided to take up this work because it wasn’t just social, cultural bias against women that existed in the country, but even the law was problematic. But when you want to reform the law, you need to challenge everything: the state, the biases against women, culture, religion and a majority of patriarchal views." She is a former Senior Advocate of Nepal.

In 2008, Malla and Yanar Mohammed were joint winners of the Gruber Prize for Women's Rights (given by the Peter and Patricia Gruber Foundation) for her work related to "public interest litigation in [Nepal], including equality in inheritance, legalization of abortion, criminalization of marital rape, equality in marriage and family law."

UN and WHO Engagement 
Malla was a member of the Committee Against Torture (CAT) during the 2014 to 2017 term. She has extensive experience as an advisor to the UN and WHO. Please see her complete curriculum vitae for complete details.

Criticism 
Malla recently received social media backlash when she presided over a bench of the Honorable Supreme Court of Nepal which granted interim-bail on medical grounds, during COVID-19, to an accused who was involved in a fatal drunk driving car accident in the capital in December 2019.

References

External links
 http://www2.ohchr.org/english/bodies/cedaw/docs/elections/PRADHAN_MALLA.pdf
 Human rights campaigners elected Informal Sector Service Centre (INSEC)

Nepalese activists
Nepalese women activists
Living people
21st-century Nepalese women politicians
21st-century Nepalese politicians
Harvard Kennedy School alumni
1963 births
Members of the 1st Nepalese Constituent Assembly